The 2013 Tour of Belgium was the 83rd edition of the Tour of Belgium cycling stage race. It took place from 22 May to 26 May 2013 in Belgium. The race was a part of the UCI Europe Tour.

Schedule

Teams
Twenty teams were invited to the 2013 Tour of Belgium: 9 UCI World Tour Teams, 6 UCI Professional Continental Teams and 5 UCI Continental Teams.

Stages

Stage 1
22 May 2013 – Lochristi to Knokke-Heist,

Stage 2
23 May 2013 – Knokke-Heist to Ninove,

Stage 3
24 May 2013 – Beveren to Beveren,

Stage 4
25 May 2013 – Eau d'Heure lakes to Eau d'Heure lakes,

Stage 5
26 May 2013 – Banneux to Banneux,

Classification leadership table

Final standings

General classification

Points classification

Combativity classification

Young rider classification

Team classification

References

External links
Race website

Tour of Belgium
Tour of Belgium
Tour of Belgium